Motor Ace are an Australian alternative rock band. Formed in Melbourne around 1998 out of the remains of another band named Snowblind, their members are Patrick ('Patch') Robertson (vocals/guitar), Damian Birchall Costin (drums), Matt Balfe (bass), and Dave Ong (guitar).

History

1988–2000: Early history 
Motor Ace began recording their debut release, a self-titled EP, during April 1999. They worked with producer Paul McKercher, who had previously worked with bands such as You Am I and The Cruel Sea. Along with 28 Days, Machine Gun Fellatio, and NoKTuRNL, they were part of a collection of young Australian acts signed to Festival Mushroom Records' development label Sputnik, which launched in 1999. The eventual track listing of their self-titled release included "Chairman of the Board", "Chromakey", "Criminal Past", "Lowrider", and "Fluke". Triple J gave the band heavy airplay, assisting the band on their touring schedule. Afterwards, the singles "Death Defy" (which was later used as the title theme for TV show The Secret Life of Us), "American Shoes", and "Hey Driver" were released throughout the course of 2000. Some of them charted in the top 100 of the ARIAnet singles chart, while also gaining popularity on Triple J.

2001–2004: Five Star Laundry and Shoot This
Motor Ace's debut album, Five Star Laundry, was released in March 2001. It was produced and engineered by Craig Harnath and Chris Dickie in February 2000 at Melbourne's Sing Sing Studios. Due to a heatwave at the time, the nearby power stations had been shut down, and the band were forced to record across the four-week period without air conditioning. During this time, Robertson also lost his voice. According to the band, vocals for the album were completed at 2am on the day both Robertson and Costin were due to fly to London to mix the album with Chris Sheldon, who had previously worked with the Foo Fighters and Therapy?. The album entered the Australian ARIA Chart at number 4.

Motor Ace's second studio album, Shoot This was released in July 2002. The album debuted at number 1 that year and was certified gold. Two singles, "Carry On" and "Keeping Secrets" reached the top 30 in the ARIA Chart.

Motor Ace were put on hold after their 2003 Japanese shows for Shoot This, after the pressuring touring and work schedule was beginning to take its toll on the band - particularly Robertson, who suffers from Crohn's disease. During this period, Costin started a music management group, Fat Guy Management (FGM), while Robertson retreated to his home in Fitzroy and began to develop his songwriting and production techniques. Ong, meanwhile, put together a country-influenced solo album under the name Joni Lightning. Towards the end of this hiatus, the band's management denied that they had split up.

2005: Animal and break-up
Preceded by first single "Tomorrow's Gone" in May 2005, the band's third album Animal was released in August 2005. A second single, "A Little Closer", was released on 12 September 2005. Animal peaked at number 21 on the ARIA Charts.

In September 2005, Motor Ace announced that they would officially disband by the year's end, playing farewell shows in Melbourne and Perth during December.

2006–2017: Post break-up
The individual members remained on amicable terms in the following years. Robertson worked professionally scoring for film and television, and also began working with Aesop. Ong still occasionally performed around Melbourne with his Joni Lightning project, before picking up work on an oil rig. Costin continued to work in the music industry, eventually founding the company 123 Agency. Balfe went on to play guitar in Melbourne band Five Mile Sniper, and also works for Yarra Valley Water. Both Robertson and Costin were also a part of the band Nighthawk, which formed in 2016.

2018: Reunion
In August 2018, it was announced that Robertson, Ong, Costin and Balfe would reunite as Motor Ace for a headlining tour in March and April 2019. The band also announced the release of both Five Star Laundry and Shoot This on vinyl, as well as releasing a compilation entitled B-Sides & Demos online.

In March 2022, Motor Ace released "Knock Knock", their first single in 17 Years.

Discography

Studio albums

Compilations

Video albums

Extended plays

Singles

Awards and nominations

ARIA Music Awards
The ARIA Music Awards are a set of annual ceremonies presented by Australian Recording Industry Association (ARIA), which recognise excellence, innovation, and achievement across all genres of the music of Australia. They commenced in 1987.

! 
|-
| 2001 || Five Star Laundry || ARIA Award for Best Rock Album||  || rowspan="2"| 
|-
| 2002 || Shoot This || Best Rock Album ||  
|-

References

External links 
 

Australian alternative rock groups
Musical groups established in 1998
Musical groups disestablished in 2005
Victoria (Australia) musical groups
Emo musical groups